Luizi is a meteorite impact structure that lies on the Kundelungu Plateau of Haut-Katanga province, in an underexplored region of southeastern Democratic Republic of the Congo. The crater, ~17 kilometer in diameter, is visible from satellite imagery, and has been confirmed in 2011 by Ferrière et al. as being caused by a large impact event. This complex meteorite impact crater is so far the only recognized one in the Democratic Republic of the Congo and even in the whole Central Africa.

The crater was initially described as a semi-circular basin by German geologist E. Grosse in 1919.

See also
Luapula River

References

Impact craters of the Democratic Republic of the Congo
Haut-Katanga Province